Hwabyeong or Hwapyŏng (hangul: 화병,) is a Korean somatization disorder, a mental illness which arises when people are unable to confront their anger as a result of conditions which they perceive to be unfair. Hwabyeong is known as a Korean culture-bound syndrome.
Hwabyeong is a colloquial name, and it refers to the etiology of the disorder rather than its symptoms or apparent characteristics. In one survey, 4.1% of the general population in a rural area in Korea were reported as having hwabyeong. Hwabyeong is similar to Amuk.

The word hwabyeong is composed of hwa (the Sino-Korean word  for "fire" which can also contextually mean "anger") and byeong (the Sino-Korean word  for "syndrome" or "illness"). It may also be called ulhwabyeong, literally "depression anger illness".

Symptoms

Physical symptoms include:
 palpitations
 anorexia
 dry mouth
 insomnia
 thoracic/chest pressure
 respiratory difficulties
 epigastric mass
 headache
 a whole-body sensation of heat (distinct from heat intolerance, a symptom of hyperthyroidism)

Psychological symptoms include:
 being easily startled
 externalization of anger, also known in Korean as "bun" (憤, "eruption of anger"), a Korean culture-related sentiment related to social unfairness
 generally sad mood
 frequent sighing
 a feeling of "eok-ul" (抑鬱, [feeling of] unfairness)
 being easily agitated
 feelings of guilt
 feelings of impending doom

Diagnosed patients may also have a medical history of prior major depressive disorder, dysthymic disorder, anxiety disorders, somatoform disorders, or adjustment disorder according to the Diagnostic and Statistical Manual of Mental Disorders, fourth edition (DSM-IV) criteria.

Diagnosed patients are most likely to be middle-aged, post-menopausal women with low socio-economic status.

Causes

Underlying causes may include:
 amuk
 prior instances of major depressive disorder
 prior instances of anxiety disorder
 prior instances of adjustment disorder
 prior instances of other somatoform disorders
 repression of feelings of anger/resentment arising from past events

Triggering causes are typically external events, including:
 familial stressors, e.g. spousal infidelity or conflict with in-laws
 witnessing acts/actions/phenomena that conflict with one's own moral and/or ethical principles

The syndrome itself is believed to be the result of the continued repression of feelings of anger without addressing their source. In holistic medicine the containment of anger in hwabyeong disturbs the balance of the five bodily elements, resulting in the development of psychosomatic symptoms such as panic, insomnia, and depression after a long period of repressed feelings.

It is possible that hormonal imbalances such as those around the time of menopause may also be an underlying cause of hwabyeong in middle-aged women, the most often-diagnosed demographic.

Treatment
Western doctors are more likely to diagnose it as a kind of stress or depression. The Diagnostic and Statistical Manual of Mental Disorders currently lists hwabyeong among its culture-bound illnesses. Outside of Korea, informally hwabyeong may be mistaken as a reference to a psychological profile marked by a short temper, or explosive, generally bellicose behavior. To the contrary, hwabyeong is a traditional psychological term used to refer to a condition characterized by passive suffering, is roughly comparable to depression, and is typically associated with older women. It is important that when diagnosing hwabyeong, the culture of the patient is well understood. Since hwabyeong can often be misdiagnosed as depression, the symptoms and culture need to be clearly and thoroughly looked into. Once hwabyeong has been diagnosed, past treatments need to be reviewed. The treatments for the patient can then be a combination of pharmacological, and therapy-based interventions.

The treatment methods used to combat hwabyeong include psychotherapy, drug treatment, family therapy, and community approaches. To be more successful, psychiatrists might need to incorporate the teachings from traditional and religious healing methods or the use of han-puri, which is the sentiment of resolving, loosening, unraveling, and appeasing negative emotions with positive ones. One example of han-puri would be a mother who has suffered from poverty, less education, a violent husband, or a harsh mother-in-law, that can be solved many years later by the success of her son for which she had endured hardships and sacrifices.

See also
 Ataque de nervios
 Anger
 Repression

References

Further reading
 Examining Anger in 'Culture-Bound' Syndromes Psychiatric Times
 Korean Women's Causal Perceptions of Hwabyung
  Hwabyung: the construction of a Korean popular illness among Korean elderly immigrant women in the United States
 Symptoms of Hwabyeong  
 Sung Kil Min, Shin-Young Suh, Ki-Jun Song (2009). Symptoms to use for Diagnostic Criteria of Hwa-Byung, an Anger Syndrome. Psychiatry Investig. 2009 March; 6(1): 7–12. Published online 2009 March 31.doi:  10.4306/pi.2009.6.1.7
 Hwa-byung: Culture-related Syndrome
 Hwabyung in Korea: Culture and Dynamic Analysis

Culture-bound syndromes
Somatic symptom disorders
Korean culture